Sacred Heart Canossian School (abbr: "SHCS"; not to be confused with Sacred Heart Canossian School Private Section) is a Catholic girls' school established at Caine Road, Mid-Levels, Hong Kong. SHCS is partially funded by the Government as a Subsidised School. It has been considered one of the most prestigious primary schools in Hong Kong. Its affiliated secondary school Sacred Heart Canossian College is also highly reputed.

History
SHCS was founded in 1860 by the Canossian Sisters of Charity. The founder of the order was Magdalene of Canossa who was subsequently canonised. It was one of the first primary schools for girls established during the British colonial period of Hong Kong.

The school moved from its previous premises at Robinson Road to its current campus at Caine Road in January 1992.

School motto
The school motto is Via, Veritas, Vita, translated into the Way, the Truth and the Life
. This is taken from verse 6 Chapter 14 of The Gospel According to John: "Jesus said: I am the Way; I am Truth and Life. No one can come to the Father except through me." This motto is common for Sacred Heart Canossian Kindergarten, SHCS, Sacred Heart Canossian School Private Section, Sacred Heart Canossian College, and Sacred Heart Canossian College of Commerce. Some students and alumnae of these schools call themselves “Sacred Heartists”.

Classes and curriculum
There are a total of 30 classes in the school. The classes for Primary 1 to Primary 3 run as pm classes. Full-time classes are offered for Primary 4 to Primary 6 students.

References

Official website
 Sacred Heart Canossian School 嘉諾撒聖心學校

Affiliated bodies
 Parents' and Teachers' Association, Sacred Heart Canossian School 嘉諾撒聖心學校家長教師會
 Sacred Heart Canossian School Alumnae Association 嘉諾撒聖心學校校友會

Related links

 Canossian Missions (HK & Macau Province) 嘉諾撒仁愛女修會 – 港澳省區
 Sacred Heart Canossian College 嘉諾撒聖心書院
 Sacred Heart Canossian College of Commerce 嘉諾撒聖心商學書院
 Sacred Heart Canossian Kindergarten 嘉諾撒聖心幼稚園
 Sacred Heart Canossian School Private Section 嘉諾撒聖心學校(私立部)

Canossian educational institutions
Catholic schools in Hong Kong
Primary schools in Hong Kong